is Pink Lady's tenth single release, and their ninth number 1 hit on the Oricon charts. The single sold approximately  1,250,000 copies, and spent six weeks at the top of the Oricon charts. This was their last consecutive number one hit.

According to Oricon, this was the 10th best selling single from 1979, and it gave Pink Lady a combined total of 63 weeks at number one - a record the duo held until January 2015, when B'z achieved a total of 64 weeks at number one with their single "Uchōten".

"Chameleon Army" was used as an insert song in the Lupin the Third Part II episode "Terror of the Chameleon Man". It was featured on the Japanese music show The Best Ten, where it peaked at #4.

A re-recorded version of the song was included on the 2-disc greatest hits release, INNOVATION, released in December 2010.

Track listing (7" vinyl) 
All lyrics are written by Yū Aku; all music is composed and arranged by Shunichi Tokura.

Chart positions

Cover versions
 South Korean singer Epaksa covered the song in his 1996 album Encyclopedia of Pon-Chak Party 1 & 2.
 Trasparenza covered the song in their 2002 album Pink Lady Euro Tracks.
 Amii Ozaki and Ami Onuki (from Puffy AmiYumi) recorded a cover version for the 2009 Pink Lady/Yū Aku tribute album Bad Friends.

References

External links
 
 

1978 singles
1978 songs
Pink Lady (band) songs
Japanese-language songs
Disco songs
Oricon Weekly number-one singles
Songs with lyrics by Yū Aku
Songs with music by Shunichi Tokura
Victor Entertainment singles